Charles Jacobs may refer to:
 Charles Fenno Jacobs (1904–1975), photojournalist, World War II and postwar period
 Charles Jacobs (Louisiana judge) (born 1970), state district court judge in Springhill, Louisiana
 Charles Jacobs (political activist), co-founder, president, and board member of the American Anti-Slavery Group
 Ron Jacobs (rugby union) (Charles Ronald Jacobs, 1928–2002), captain of the England national rugby union team
 Clare Jacobs (1886–1971), pole vault, 1908 Olympic Games, often mistakenly listed in sources as Charles Jacobs

See also
Charles Jacob (disambiguation)